The INTA-300, also known as the "Flamenco", was a two-stage Spanish sounding rocket. It consisted of a launch stage from the type Heron and an upper stage of the type Snipe. The INTA-300 was launched six times between 1974 and 1994. Based on a British Aerojet's model INTA-255 model of rocket, the INTA-300 is capable of reaching altitudes of 300 km (186 mi) alone and to 50 km (31 mi) with its maximum payload weight with a thrust of 138.00 kN. The intent of the INTA-300 was to be able to lift a payload of 50 kg to the full 300 km which, with the help of the Bristol Aerojet, the Instituto Nacional de Técnica Aeroespacial was able to make a powerful enough prototype of the INTA-300 in 1981 after three unsuccessful launches. But by the time of the fourth model's construction, funding had been cut.

When funds became available again in the 1990s, the fourth model of the INTA-300 was modified into a more efficient model dubbed the INTA-300B, capable of carrying heavier payloads with higher altitude-reaching capabilities.

See also 
 INTA-255
 Capricornio (rocket)
 Miura 1

References 

Sounding rockets of Spain
Space launch vehicles of Spain
Spaceflight
Instituto Nacional de Técnica Aeroespacial